Wankara (Aymara for a kind of drum, Hispanicized spelling Huancara) is a mountain in the Andes of Peru, about  high. It is located in the Puno Region, Lampa Province, on the border of the districts Paratía and Santa Lucía. Wankara lies southwest of the mountains Phisqa Tira, Awallani and Kuntur Ikiña and northwest of Pukasalla.

References

Mountains of Puno Region
Mountains of Peru